John Webster was an English footballer who played in the Football League for Gainsborough Trinity, Rotherham Town and The Wednesday.

References

Date of death unknown
English footballers
Association football forwards
English Football League players
Attercliffe F.C. players
Sheffield Wednesday F.C. players
Rotherham Town F.C. (1878) players
Gainsborough Trinity F.C. players
Year of birth missing